Gertrude Macdonald or Biddy Jamieson (1871 – 1952) was an English painter.

Macdonald was born and trained in England but moved to Paris where she met and married her husband, the Scottish painter Alexander Jamieson. They married in 1907. Her work Portrait of the Lady Alix Egerton was included in the book Women Painters of the World.

References

External links 

 OCLC link for 1970 exhibition catalog on the couple's work in the Hazlitt Gallery, London, October - November, 1970.
 

1871 births
1952 deaths
19th-century English women artists
20th-century English women artists
19th-century English painters
20th-century English painters
English women painters